The women's team tournament of the 2018 World Team Table Tennis Championships was held from 29 April to 6 May 2018. The draw for the tournament was held at 27 February 2018.

China won the title after defeating Japan in the final.

Championship division

Preliminary round

Group A

Group B

Group C

Group D

Knockout stage
The group winners of Groups C and D were drawn, as well as the second and third placed teams. Same for the fourth, fifth and sixth placed teams.

Places 13–24

Places 1–12
All times are local (UTC+2).

Round of 16

Quarterfinals

Before the match, both teams entered the stage together and decided not to play against each other. Meanwhile, a unified Korean team played in the semifinals. That move was agreed upon by the ITTF.

Semifinals

Final

Second division

Preliminary round

Group E

Group F

Group G

Group H

Knockout stage
The group winners of Groups G and H were drawn, as well as the second and third placed teams. Same for the fourth, fifth and sixth placed teams.

Places 37–48

Places 25–36

Third division

Preliminary round

Group I

Group J

Group K

Group L

Knockout stage
The group winners of Groups K and L were drawn, as well as the second and third placed teams. Same for the fourth, fifth and sixth placed teams.

Places 61–72

69th place bracket

Places 49–60

57th place bracket

References

2018 World Team Table Tennis Championships
World